The Sanchaji Bridge is a self-anchored suspension bridge in Changsha, Hunan, China. It is signed as part of the North Second Ring Road. The bridge crosses the Xiang River between Yuelu District and Kaifu District.

Name
The name of the bridge comes from the historic place "Sanchaji", which is a community in Yuelu District now.

Design
The bridge over the Xiang River had the longest self-anchored suspension bridge in the world when it was completed in June 2006–. This was a record during that time.

History
Before 2004, crossing the Xiang River was a time-consuming ordeal. The only way to cross the river was via ferry, and due to the ever growing number of cars, the Changsha government knew that a bridge was needed to support transportation.

The Sanchaji Bridge designed by Central South University and Changsha Planning Institute. The bridge was bid in 2004 to the 5th Branch of Bureau of Bridge, China Railway Group. The foundation stone laying ceremony was held on April 30, 2004. Construction began in April 2004 and was completed in June 2006. The contracted designer was Huang Yuanqun.

References

Suspension bridges in China
Concrete bridges in China
Steel bridges in China
Bridges completed in 2006
Bridges in Hunan
2006 establishments in China